Vallur is a village in Tangutur Mandal of Prakasham district of the Indian state of Andhra Pradesh.It is located towards south from District headquarters ongole.  from Tangutur. There is a famous Valluramma Temple lies on the bank of the lake. It is near to Bay of Bengal. There is a chance of humidity in the weather.

References 

Villages in Prakasam district